The black-eared shrike-babbler (Pteruthius melanotis) is a bird species in the vireo family, Vireonidae. It was traditionally considered as an aberrant Old World babbler and formerly placed in the family Timaliidae.  It was long noted that their habits resembled those of vireos, but this was previously ascribed to the result of convergent evolution. It is found in Southeast Asia from the Himalayas to western Malaysia. Its natural habitat is subtropical or tropical moist montane forests.

Gallery

References

Collar, N. J. & Robson, C. 2007. Family Timaliidae (Babblers)  pp. 70 – 291 in; del Hoyo, J., Elliott, A. & Christie, D.A. eds. Handbook of the Birds of the World, Vol. 12. Picathartes to Tits and Chickadees. Lynx Edicions, Barcelona.

black-eared shrike-babbler
Birds of Bhutan
Birds of Laos
Birds of Nepal
Birds of Northeast India
Birds of Yunnan
Birds of Southeast Asia
black-eared shrike-babbler
Taxonomy articles created by Polbot